The New York Yankees are a Major League Baseball team based in The Bronx, New York. The team competes as a member club of the American League (AL) East division. Established in 1901 as the Baltimore Orioles (no relation to the modern Baltimore Orioles), the team relocated to New York in 1903 as the New York Highlanders, they officially renamed to their current name in 1913.

A total of 61 players, managers, and executives (24 of whom are inducted as Yankees) in the National Baseball Hall of Fame and Museum, plus seven broadcasters who have received the Hall's Ford C. Frick Award, spent part or all of their professional careers with the Yankees.

Key

List

Inductees

Honored broadcasters
The Frick Award, according to the Hall, "is presented annually to a broadcaster for 'major contributions to baseball.' " The Hall explicitly states that Frick honorees are not members of the Hall.

See also
List of St. Louis Cardinals in the Baseball Hall of Fame
List of Los Angeles Dodgers in the Baseball Hall of Fame

References

External links
New York Yankees Hall of Famers

Hall of Fame
Yankees